Joseph Sullivan (8 September 1866 – 13 February 1935) was a Scottish Labour Party politician who served as a Member of Parliament (MP) from 1922 to 1924, and from 1926 to 1931.

Born in Cambuslang, Sullivan was educated in Bellshill and Newton, before becoming a coal miner.  He became active in the Lanarkshire Miners' County Union, serving as its president, and as a full-time agent for the union.

At the 1906 United Kingdom general election, Sullivan stood for the Scottish Workers' Representation Committee in North West Lanarkshire, but was not elected.  In 1909, the committee became part of the Labour Party, for which Sullivan stood in North East Lanarkshire at the January 1910 United Kingdom general election, but he was again unsuccessful.

At the 1918 general election, he unsuccessfully contested the North Lanarkshire constituency, but won the seat at the 1922 general election. He was re-elected in 1923, but was defeated at the 1924 general election by the Conservative Party candidate Sir Alexander Sprot.

In 1926 he was returned to the House of Commons as MP for Bothwell, at a by-election following the death of the Labour MP John Robertson. He was re-elected in 1929, but lost the seat at the 1931 general election when the Labour vote collapsed as the party split over its leader Ramsay MacDonald's formation of a National Government.

References

Sources

External links 
 

1866 births
1935 deaths
Members of the Parliament of the United Kingdom for Scottish constituencies
Miners' Federation of Great Britain-sponsored MPs
Scottish Labour MPs
UK MPs 1922–1923
UK MPs 1923–1924
UK MPs 1924–1929
UK MPs 1929–1931